Elora is an unincorporated community in Lincoln County, Tennessee, United States. It has a post office with zip code 37328.

Elora is concentrated around the intersection of Tennessee State Route 121 and Tennessee State Route 122 (John Hunter Highway).  SR 121 connects Elora to U.S. Route 64 and the Tims Ford Lake area to the north and Madison County, Alabama, to the southwest, while SR 122 connects Elora with Huntland to the east.

Elora was originally known as Baxter Station, and was established as a stop along the Fayetteville and Decherd Branch Railroad in the 1850s.

Notable people
George C. Hawkins, member of both houses of the Alabama State Legislature, 1951-1959 (House) and 1963-1967 (Senate), born in Elora in 1918; practicing attorney in Gadsden
Bill Hefner, member of the United States House of Representatives from North Carolina, was born in Elora.

References

External links

Unincorporated communities in Lincoln County, Tennessee
Unincorporated communities in Tennessee